Diogo Filipe Costa Rocha (born 3 May 1995), known as Rochinha, is a Portuguese professional footballer who plays for Primeira Liga club Sporting CP as an attacking midfielder.

Club career
Born in Espinho, Aveiro District of Angolan descent, Rochinha started his youth career with FC Porto and finished it with S.L. Benfica, making five assists and scoring six goals for the latter during the 2013–14 edition of the UEFA Youth League. He made his senior debut with their reserves on 1 October 2014, coming on as a 79th-minute substitute in a 1–1 home draw against C.D. Santa Clara in the Segunda Liga.

On 26 January 2015, Benfica announced that Rochinha had been loaned to English club Bolton Wanderers. He first appeared in the Championship on 17 March, starting and being replaced towards the end of the 1–0 away loss to Ipswich Town, for which he earned praise from manager Neil Lennon.

Rochinha signed a three-year contract with Belgian side Standard Liège on 30 July 2015. On 26 December 2016, after several months without a team, he returned to his country and joined Boavista F.C. for an undisclosed fee. His first game in the Primeira Liga took place on 4 February 2017 when he played injury time in a 0–0 draw at G.D. Chaves, and his first goal came early into the following season but in a 2–1 defeat against Portimonense SC.

On 30 January 2019, Rochinha agreed to a four-and-a-half-year deal at Vitória S.C. in the same league. He scored 19 times during his spell at the Estádio D. Afonso Henriques, adding 17 assists in 122 competitive matches.

On 6 July 2022, Rochinha joined Sporting CP on a four-year contract for €2 million, with Vitória being entitled to 10% of a future transfer.

International career
Rochinha represented Portugal at under-17 and under-19 levels.

Honours
Benfica
UEFA Youth League runner-up: 2013–14

References

External links

1995 births
Living people
People from Espinho, Portugal
Portuguese sportspeople of Angolan descent
Sportspeople from Aveiro District
Portuguese footballers
Association football midfielders
Primeira Liga players
Liga Portugal 2 players
S.L. Benfica B players
Boavista F.C. players
Vitória S.C. players
Sporting CP footballers
English Football League players
Bolton Wanderers F.C. players
Belgian Pro League players
Standard Liège players
Portugal youth international footballers
Portuguese expatriate footballers
Expatriate footballers in England
Expatriate footballers in Belgium
Portuguese expatriate sportspeople in England
Portuguese expatriate sportspeople in Belgium